Chester Spurgeon Clemens (May 10, 1917 – February 10, 2002) was a professional baseball player. He played parts of two seasons in Major League Baseball, primarily as an outfielder. He appeared in nine games for the Boston Braves (then known as the Bees) in 1939, then nineteen games in 1944, again for the Braves.

External links

Major League Baseball outfielders
Boston Bees players
Boston Braves players
Portageville Pirates players
Owensboro Pirates players
Leesburg Gondoliers players
Evansville Bees players
Hartford Bees players
Newark Bears (IL) players
Indianapolis Indians players
Baseball players from California
1917 births
2002 deaths
San Fernando High School alumni